Trichaetoides separabilis is a moth in the family Erebidae. It was described by Francis Walker in 1862. It is found on Borneo. The habitat consists of lowland alluvial forests and dipterocarp forests.

References

Moths described in 1862
Syntomini